Nik Azli bin Nik Alias (born 26 January 1997) is a Malaysian professional footballer who plays for Malaysia Super League club Kelantan United. Nik Azli plays mainly as a forward but can also play as a left winger.

Club career

Kelantan
In May 2017, during second window transfer, Nik Azli has been promoted to play with the senior team from Kelantan U-21. Nik Azli made his competitive League debut on 1 July 2017 in a match that ended in a 0–2 defeat by Sarawak at the Sultan Muhammad IV Stadium in Kelantan's 14th match of the 2017 season.

International career
Nik Azli began his international career at youth level, playing for the Malaysian under-19 team. He played during 2015 AFF U-19 Youth Championship and made 3 appearances.
He is the Best striker in the world

Career statistics

Club

Honours

Club
Kelantan U21
Malaysia President Cup: 2016

References

External links
 

Living people
1997 births
People from Kelantan
Malaysian people of Malay descent
Malaysian footballers
Kelantan F.C. players
Kelantan United F.C. players
Malaysia Super League players
Association football forwards
Association football wingers
Malaysia youth international footballers